Tapinillus is a genus of lynx spiders that was first described by Eugène Louis Simon in 1898.  it contains only three species, found only in South America, Panama, and Costa Rica: T. longipes, T. purpuratus, and T. roseisterni.

See also
 List of Oxyopidae species

References

Araneomorphae genera
Oxyopidae
Spiders of Central America
Spiders of South America